K45HW was a low-powered television station affiliated with the Mexico-based Multimedios Television, owned and operated by Mintz Broadcasting.  It broadcast on channel 45 and was licensed to San Angelo, Texas.

The station had an application with the FCC to flash cut its channel 45 signal to digital but it was never built.

External links 
 

Television stations in Texas
Mass media in San Angelo, Texas
Television channels and stations established in 2004
Defunct television stations in the United States
Television channels and stations disestablished in 2011
2004 establishments in Texas
2011 disestablishments in Texas
45HW